Thakkali Srinivasan is an Indian film director, musician and producer who has worked on Tamil films, often involving horror or murder mystery plotlines.

Career
Thakkali Srinivasan began his career off as a producer and made the science fiction film Nalaya Manithan (1989) directed by Velu Prabhakaran. The success of the film prompted him to produce a sequel titled Adhisaya Manithan (1990) with a different cast, and the project did not perform as well commercially. He had also composed music for the films, along with Premi, forming the Premi–Srini duo largely supported by another music director Manachanallur Giridharan. Subsequently, he directed two films in the 1990s, the horror film Jenma Natchathram (1991) with Nassar and the murder mystery film, Witness (1995) with Raghuvaran in the lead role. He began work on the production of a Pandiarajan-starrer titled Maaruvedam in the late 1990s, but the film was later shelved.

In 2001, he made Asokavanam, another murder mystery film featuring Livignston, Sriman and Riyaz Khan and won mixed reviews for his work. A critic from The Hindu noted that "the script is good in the first half but sags in the second". He later began working on a film titled Satrumun Kidaitha Thagaval (2009) featuring Kanal Kannan, but was replaced midway through production by a debutant director, Bhuvanai Kannan. His latest release was Aduthathu (2011), a thriller about reality show contestants on a desert island, starring Sriman in the lead role.

Filmography

References

20th-century Indian film directors
Tamil-language film directors
Living people
21st-century Indian film directors
Year of birth missing (living people)